

Current justices

List of justices before 1947
Before 1947 and particularly after 1844, the structure of the New Jersey state judiciary was incredibly complex. In some cases, it is not entirely clear whether the following justices served on the Supreme Court of New Jersey (1776–), the New Jersey Court of Common Pleas (1704–1947), or the New Jersey Court of Errors and Appeals (1844–1947).

1776 Constitution

1844 Constitution

Supreme Court justices under 1947 Constitution

List of justices

Acting justices 
On May 3, 2010, Governor Chris Christie declined to re-nominate John E. Wallace Jr., whose seven-year term expired on May 20, 2010. He was the first Justice of the Supreme Court to be denied tenure in more than a half-century since the adoption of the Constitution of New Jersey in 1947. To fill the vacancy Chief Justice Stuart Rabner appointed a number of acting judges (known as Judge of the Appellate Division, Temporarily Assigned to the Supreme Court) during an extended period of controversy and conflict with the New Jersey Senate about the court's political composition.

Mary Catherine Cuff
Ariel A. Rodriguez
Edwin Stern
Dorothea O'C. Wefing

Timeline of justices

See also 

Judiciary of New Jersey
Courts of New Jersey

Notelist

References

 
New Jersey
Justices